Leroy Jackson (born December 8, 1939) is a former American football halfback in the National Football League for the Washington Redskins. He played college football at Western Illinois University and is a member of the school's athletic Hall of Fame.

On December 8, 1962, his 23rd birthday, Jackson caught an 85-yard touchdown pass for the Redskins from quarterback Norm Snead in a 34–21 loss to the Baltimore Colts. He had been a first-round NFL draft pick of the Cleveland Browns, the 11th player selected in the 1962 draft.  Jackson, along with Bobby Mitchell, was traded by the Browns to the Washington Redskins in exchange for Ernie Davis in 1962.

Jackson was the Illinois state champion in the 100-yard dash three years in a row for Bloom High School from 1956–58.

1939 births
Living people
American football running backs
People from Chicago Heights, Illinois
Players of American football from Illinois
Sportspeople from Cook County, Illinois
Washington Redskins players
Western Illinois Leathernecks football players
Irons family (American football)